Duncan Elphinstone Cooper (c. 1813 – 22 November 1904) was an Indian-born Australian cricketer who played for Victoria. He was born in Bengal, India and died in Paddington.

He was the son of Major General George Cooper (1777–1847) and his first wife Jane née Munn (1778–1823).

In 1841 Cooper travelled from London to Australia with George and Harry Thompson, brothers who were to become his partners as squatters and sheep farmers near Fiery Creek, Raglan. In his spare time Duncan painted landscapes of the surrounding area which were later gathered together and published as The Challicum Sketch Book. In 1849 he occupied the Warrapinjoe run, adjacent to the Thomson brothers' run, with an extent of 14,052 acres.

Cooper made a single first-class appearance for the Victorian cricket team, during the 1850–51 season, against Tasmania. This match was the first ever first-class cricket match in Australia. Cooper opened the batting, and thus faced the first ball in Australian first-class cricket. He scored four runs in the first innings, and a duck in the second.

In 1854 Cooper left Australia and returned to London. In 1875 he presented 26 volumes of the work of the Bewick brothers to the Melbourne Public Library. He lived in London, a bachelor, until his death at the age of 90.

References

External links
 
 Duncan Cooper at Cricket Archive

1813 births
1904 deaths
Australian pastoralists
Australian cricketers
Victoria cricketers
Melbourne Cricket Club cricketers
Australian landscape painters
19th-century Australian businesspeople